Lectionary 1681, or ℓ 1681 in the Gregory-Aland numbering, is a Greek manuscript of the New Testament, on paper leaves, dated paleographically to the 15th century.

Description 

It is written in Greek minuscule letters, written on 186 paper leaves (21.5 cm by 15 cm), in 1 column per page, 26-28 lines per page. The codex contains some Lessons from the four Gospels lectionary (Evangelistarium). The initial letters in red. It contains the decorated headpieces, hypothesis, and some notes on the margin.

The codex now is located in the Bible Museum Münster (MS. 12).

See also 

 List of New Testament lectionaries
 Textual criticism
 Bible Museum Münster

References

Further reading 

 S. P. Lambros, Νέος Ἑλληνομνήμων 12 (1915), p. 129.

External links 

 Lectionary 1681 at the CSNTM
 Manuscripts of the Bible Museum

Greek New Testament lectionaries
15th-century biblical manuscripts